Islamic Arab Insurance Company commonly known as Salama, سلامة is a takaful company based in Dubai, United Arab Emirates. The company and its subsidiaries operates in the UAE, Algeria, Egypt, Senegal, and Saudi Arabia.

Salama was founded in 1979 and is listed on the Dubai Financial Market. It is one of the leading takaful companies in the region, offering products in family and general takaful. Its subsidiary, Best Re, is one of the largest retakaful companies in the world.

The company won Best Takaful Company (Middle East) at the 2012 International Takaful Awards.

Salama specializes in Sharia-compliant insurance products, which are designed to meet the needs of Muslim customers who want insurance coverage that aligns with their religious beliefs. Sharia-compliant insurance, also known as takaful, operates on the principle of mutual cooperation and shared risk among policyholders, and is structured in a way that avoids charging interest or engaging in speculative investments.

References

External links
 

Takaful companies of the United Arab Emirates
Financial services companies established in 1979
Companies based in Dubai
Emirati companies established in 1979